Peter C. Wambach, Jr. (born May 12, 1946) is a former Democratic member of the Pennsylvania House of Representatives.

References

Democratic Party members of the Pennsylvania House of Representatives
Living people
1946 births